Roland Johansson (15 February 1909 – 11 November 1979) was a Swedish swimmer. He competed in the men's 100 metre backstroke event at the 1928 Summer Olympics.

References

External links
 

1909 births
1979 deaths
Olympic swimmers of Sweden
Swimmers at the 1928 Summer Olympics
Sportspeople from Norrköping
Swedish male backstroke swimmers
20th-century Swedish people